Erad or ERAD may refer to:

Endoplasmic-reticulum-associated protein degradation
Erad, Iran, a city in Fars Province
European Conference on Radar in Meteorology and Hydrology
Automobiles ERAD (Études et Réalisations du Douaisis), a French manufacturer of microcars

See also
Irad, a Biblical name